Forrest Gump: The Soundtrack is the soundtrack album based on the Academy Award-winning film Forrest Gump, and contains music from many well-known American artists. The score, composed by Alan Silvestri, was released separately (as Forrest Gump – Original Motion Picture Score) on the same day. The album was reissued in 2001 with two
additional tracks.

Commercial Performance
The soundtrack jumped from number 34 to 7 on the Billboard 200 albums chart on July 30, 1994. The next week on August 6, 1994, it moved from number 7 to 3, staying there for one week. It reached its peak position of number 2 on the chart on August 13, 1994, staying there for seven weeks until September 17, 1994, when it was displaced by the soundtrack of The Lion King. The Forrest Gump soundtrack dropped from the charts on October 15, 1994. In Canada, it reached number one for one week in September 1994.

Track listing

Disc one
"Hound Dog" (1956) performed by Elvis Presley – 2:16
"Rebel Rouser" (1958) performed by Duane Eddy – 2:21
"(I Don't Know Why) But I Do" (1961) performed by Clarence "Frogman" Henry – 2:18
"Walk Right In" (1963) performed by the Rooftop Singers – 2:33
"Land of 1000 Dances" (1966) performed by Wilson Pickett – 2:25
"Blowin' in the Wind" (1967) performed by Joan Baez – 2:49
"Fortunate Son" (1969) performed by Creedence Clearwater Revival – 2:18
"I Can't Help Myself (Sugar Pie Honey Bunch)" (1965) performed by the Four Tops – 2:43
"Respect" (1967) performed by Aretha Franklin – 2:27
"Rainy Day Women #12 & 35" (1966) performed by Bob Dylan – 4:35
"Sloop John B" (1966) performed by the Beach Boys – 2:56
"California Dreamin'" (1966) performed by the Mamas & the Papas – 2:39
"For What It's Worth" (1966) performed by Buffalo Springfield – 2:38
"What the World Needs Now Is Love" (1965) performed by Jackie DeShannon – 3:13
"Break on Through (To the Other Side)" (1967) performed by the Doors – 2:28
"Mrs. Robinson" (1968) performed by Simon & Garfunkel – 3:51

Disc two
"Volunteers" (1969) performed by Jefferson Airplane – 2:04
"Get Together" (1967) performed by the Youngbloods – 4:36
"San Francisco (Be Sure to Wear Flowers in Your Hair)" (1967) performed by Scott McKenzie – 2:58
"Turn! Turn! Turn! (To Everything There Is a Season)" (1965) performed by the Byrds – 3:54
"Medley: Aquarius/Let the Sunshine In" (1969) performed by the 5th Dimension – 4:48
"Everybody's Talkin'" (1968) performed by Harry Nilsson – 2:44
"Joy to the World" (1970) performed by Three Dog Night – 3:16
"Stoned Love" (1970) performed by the Supremes – 2:59
"Raindrops Keep Fallin' on My Head" (1969) performed by B. J. Thomas – 3:00
"Mr. President (Have Pity on the Working Man)" (1974) performed by Randy Newman – 2:46
"Sweet Home Alabama" (1974) performed by Lynyrd Skynyrd – 4:43
"Running On Empty" (1978) performed by Jackson Browne - 4:56 Additional Bonus track on Collector's Edition CD 2001
"It Keeps You Runnin'" (1976) performed by the Doobie Brothers – 4:13
"I've Got to Use My Imagination" (1973) performed by Gladys Knight & the Pips – 3:30
"Go Your Own Way" (1977) performed by Fleetwood Mac – 3:39 Additional Bonus track on Collector's Edition CD 2001
"On the Road Again" (1980) performed by Willie Nelson – 2:29
"Against the Wind" (1980) performed by Bob Seger & the Silver Bullet Band – 5:33
"Forrest Gump Suite" (1994) composed and conducted by Alan Silvestri – 8:48

Additional songs
Songs in the movie but not on the soundtrack include:
"Lovesick Blues" – Hank Williams
"Sugar Shack" – Jimmy Gilmer and the Fireballs
"Hanky Panky" – Tommy James and the Shondells
"Paint It Black" – The Rolling Stones
"All Along the Watchtower" – The Jimi Hendrix Experience
"Soul Kitchen" – The Doors
"Hello, I Love You" – The Doors
"People Are Strange" – The Doors
"Love Her Madly" – The Doors
"Hey Joe" – The Jimi Hendrix Experience
"Where Have All the Flowers Gone?" – Pete Seeger
"Let's Work Together" – Canned Heat
"Tie a Yellow Ribbon Round the Ole Oak Tree" – Tony Orlando & Dawn
"Get Down Tonight" – KC & the Sunshine Band
"Free Bird" – Lynyrd Skynyrd
"Running on Empty" – Jackson Browne Additional Bonus track on Collector's Edition CD 2001
"Go Your Own Way" – Fleetwood Mac Additional  Bonus track on Collector's Edition CD 2001

John Lennon's song "Imagine" is mentioned and has its lyrics quoted, but was not used in the film.

Charts

Weekly charts

Year-end charts

Decade-end charts

Sales and certifications

See also
 List of best-selling albums in Australia
 List of best-selling albums in the United States

References

1994 soundtrack albums
Epic Records soundtracks
1994 compilation albums
Comedy film soundtracks
Drama film soundtracks